{{DISPLAYTITLE:C12H11NO}}
The molecular formula C12H11NO (molar mass 185.22 g/mol, exact mass: 185.0841 u) may refer to:

 1-Naphthaleneacetamide (NAAm)
 Pirfenidone